John Lewis  (12 February 1844 – 25 August 1923) was an Australian pastoralist and politician. He was a member of the South Australian Legislative Council from 1898 to 1923, representing the Northern District (1898-1902) and North-Eastern District (1902-1923). He was the father of Essington Lewis.

History
Lewis was born in Brighton, South Australia, the son of James Lewis, who had been a member of the original party, under William Light, which surveyed the City of Adelaide, and had accompanied Charles Sturt on his 1844 expedition down the Murray.

He left school at the age of twelve to work on his father's farm at Richmond, leaving him two years later to work as a sheep drover and other occupations. From 1867 to 1885 he was employed as Liston, Shakes and Co.'s agent in Burra. In 1871 he made a trip to the Northern Territory with his brother James to secure a property on behalf of George McLachlan. He set down details of this trip in his autobiography Fought and Won.

He returned to Adelaide in 1876, when he married and settled in Burra. He joined William Liston (ca.1840–1901) and James Shakes in their stock and station agency, and acted as their agent in Burra from 1876 to 1885 when Liston resigned and the company operated as Lewis & Shakes until 1888 when they joined with George W. Bagot as Bagot, Shakes & Lewis. The company absorbed Luxmoore, Dowling & Jeffrey in May 1906 and about the same time Lewis left Burra for Adelaide, moving into the imposing residence 'Benacre' in Glen Osmond, built for William Bickford. He acquired various pastoral properties in South Australia: Dalhousie Springs, Witchelina, Mount Nor'-West, Ediacara, Nappa Merrie, Coronga Peak, and Newcastle Waters, many in conjunction with Sir Thomas Elder.

Bagot, Shakes & Lewis was absorbed by Goldsbrough Mort & Co. in 1924.

Politics
In 1897 he stood as candidate for the North-Eastern district in the Legislative Council and was successful; in 1902 he was a successful candidate for the Northern seat, and held it until 1923.

Other interests
He was a member of the South Australian branch of the Royal Geographical Society and for seven years its president. He was vice-president of the Royal Society of St. George, an active member of the Pastoralists' Association, the Aborigines' Friends' Association, the Horticultural and Floricultural Society, the South Australian Soldiers Fund, and the Adelaide Children's Hospital.

Family
Lewis married Martha Anne Brook (c. 1847 – 3 July 1894) on 18 September 1876. He married again on 5 July 1907 to widow Florence Margaret Toll ( – 23 February 1941), the youngest daughter of William Ranson Mortlock.

Recognition
He was awarded CMG in January 1923.

Bibliography
Lewis, John (1844–1923) Fought and Won first published in Adelaide by W.K. Thomas & Co., 1922.
(facsimile edition) Adelaide; Printed by Gillingham Printers, 1985.

References 

1844 births
1923 deaths
Members of the South Australian Legislative Council
Australian stock and station agents